Miscera ampla is a moth in the family Brachodidae. It was described by Turner in 1942. It is found in Australia.

References

Natural History Museum Lepidoptera generic names catalog

Brachodidae
Moths described in 1942